Pain Kuh or Paeenkuh may refer to:
 Pain Kuh, Fars
 Pain Kuh, Zanjan